The Tyrant King is a six-part children's serial drama directed by Mike Hodges, made by ABC Weekend TV and screened by Thames Television in 1968. It was dramatised from the book of the same name by Aylmer Hall, adapted for television by Trevor Preston. It was notable for its use of a progressive music soundtrack, including music from The Rolling Stones, The Moody Blues, Cream, Pink Floyd, and in particular, The Nice, whose song "The Thoughts of Emerlist Davjack", from the album of the same name was the title track.

Story
The story begins with three children overhearing a mysterious conversation, leading them to follow the clues across the tourist attractions of London.

Cast
 Murray Melvin (Uncle Gerry)
 Candace Glendenning (Charlotte) - credited as Candy Glendenning
 Edward McMurray (Bill Hallen) - credited as Eddie McMurray
 Kim Fortune (Peter Thorne)
 Philip Madoc (Scarface)

The credits note that the three juvenile leads are "Pupils of Italia Conti Stage School."

Soundtrack
Tracks include:
 The Thoughts of Emerlist Davjack (The Nice)
 Tantalising Maggie (The Nice)
 Astronomy Domine (Pink Floyd)
 Dr. Livingstone, I Presume (The Moody Blues)
 As You Said (Cream)
 A Saucerful of Secrets (Pink Floyd)
 She's a Rainbow (The Rolling Stones)

External links
The Tyrant King - The Complete Series / DVD Review Frank Collins, Saturday, 19 November 2011.
The Tyrant King - The Complete Series / DVD Review by Tim Worthington.

1960s British children's television series
ITV children's television shows
Television shows produced by ABC Weekend TV
Television series by FremantleMedia Kids & Family
English-language television shows